Desert Dream, also known as Hyazgar, is a 2006 drama film written and directed by Korean-Chinese filmmaker Zhang Lu. It is a co-production between Korea, Mongolia and France. The film opened the 2006 Asian Summer Film Festival in Barcelona.

Plot

Cast
 Suh Jung as Choi Soon-hee
 Bat-Ulzii as Hungai
 Shin Dong-ho as Chang-ho
 Munkhjiin as Jorick
 Enkhtuul as Oyona
 Bayasgalan as Sarnai

References

External links
 
 
 

2006 films
2000s Korean-language films
2006 drama films
South Korean drama films
Films directed by Zhang Lu
2000s South Korean films